Ucha Gogoladze (born 2 May 1990) is a Georgian professional football player.

External links

Profile at Dinamo Brest website

1990 births
Living people
Footballers from Georgia (country)
Association football forwards
Expatriate footballers from Georgia (country)
Expatriate footballers in Belarus
Expatriate footballers in Armenia
FC Borjomi players
FC Dynamo Brest players
FC Urartu players
FC Slutsk players